L'École des points vitaux (The school of vital points) is the second official album by French rap group Sexion d'Assaut composed of Maître Gims, Lefa, Barack Adama, Maska, JR O Crom, Black M, Doomams, and L.I.O. Petrodollars (which only appears once in the album). This album was released on March 29, 2010 in stores and available for download.

In November 2010, the album was certified triple platinum in France. It has sold nearly 400,000 copies. It is Maître Gims who signs most of the instrumentals on this CD.

Track listing

Charts

Weekly charts

Year-end charts

References

2010 albums
French-language albums